Trachycystis is a genus of small air-breathing land snails, terrestrial pulmonate gastropod mollusks in the family Charopidae.

Species
Species within the genus Trachycystis include:
Trachycystis abyssinica 
Trachycystis bathycoele 
Trachycystis bernardinae 
Trachycystis bifoveata 
Trachycystis bisculpta 
Trachycystis chancogneae 
Trachycystis clifdeni Connolly, 1932 (vernacular name: Dlinza Forest pinwheel)
Trachycystis colorama
Trachycystis contabulata 
Trachycystis contrasta 
Trachycystis crudieri 
Trachycystis falconi 
Trachycystis felina 
Trachycystis ferarum 
Trachycystis fossula 
Trachycystis franzi 
Trachycystis gemmascabra 
Trachycystis glanvilliana 
Trachycystis glebaria 
Trachycystis haygarthi 
Trachycystis hoperni 
Trachycystis igembiensis 
Trachycystis iredalei 
Trachycystis jucunda 
Trachycystis kermadeci 
Trachycystis kincaidi 
Trachycystis lamellifera 
Trachycystis lamellosa 
Trachycystis langi 
Trachycystis laticostata 
Trachycystis legetetana 
Trachycystis leucocarina 
Trachycystis liricostata 
Trachycystis lunaris 
Trachycystis marcelini 
Trachycystis masina 
Trachycystis mcbeani 
Trachycystis mcdowelli 
Trachycystis mediocris 
Trachycystis microscopica 
Trachycystis montissalinarum 
Trachycystis palaeokempi 
Trachycystis patera 
Trachycystis placenta 
Trachycystis proxima 
Trachycystis pura 
Trachycystis rariplicata 
Trachycystis rivularis 
Trachycystis rubra 
Trachycystis rudicostata 
Trachycystis sabuletorum 
Trachycystis somersetensis 
Trachycystis soror 
Trachycystis subpinguis 
Trachycystis teretiuscula 
Trachycystis tollini 
Trachycystis ulrichi 
Trachycystis venatorum 
Trachycystis vengoensis 
Trachycystis waterloti 
Trachycystis wilmattae

References

Bank, R. (2017). Classification of the Recent terrestrial Gastropoda of the World. Last update: July 16th, 2017

Charopidae
Taxonomy articles created by Polbot